Feyenoord is a Dutch professional football club from Rotterdam, that plays in the Eredivisie. Founded as Wilhelmina in 1908, the club changed its name in 1912 to SC Feijenoord (since 1973 Feyenoord for international reasons) and moved to De Kuip in 1937. Feyenoord is one of the most successful clubs in the Netherlands, winning 15 Eredivisie titles, 11 KNVB Cups and two Johan Cruijff Shields. The club also has won one European Cup, two UEFA Cups and one Intercontinental Cup. The club is historically one of the three clubs that have dominated the Eredivisie (first tier) of Dutch football, the others being Ajax and PSV. These three clubs have always played in the Eredivisie, since its inception in 1952, and have never been relegated to lower divisions.

List of players 

Appearances and goals are for first-team league matches only, including both the Netherlands Football League Championship and Eredivisie.
Players are listed according to the date of their first team debut for the club.

Statistics correct as of 04 January 2023.

Table headers
 Nationality – If a player played international football, the country/countries he played for are shown. Otherwise, the player's nationality is given as their country of birth.
 Feyenoord career – The year of the player's first appearance for Feyenoord to the year of his last appearance.
 Appearances – The number of league games played.
 Goals – The number of league goals scored.

References

 
Association football player non-biographical articles
Feyenoord